In mathematics, the Carathéodory metric is a metric defined on the open unit ball of a complex Banach space that has many similar properties to the Poincaré metric of hyperbolic geometry. It is named after the Greek mathematician Constantin Carathéodory.

Definition

Let (X, || ||) be a complex Banach space and let B be the open unit ball in X. Let Δ denote the open unit disc in the complex plane C, thought of as the Poincaré disc model for 2-dimensional real/1-dimensional complex hyperbolic geometry. Let the Poincaré metric ρ on Δ be given by

(thus fixing the curvature to be −4). Then the Carathéodory metric d on B is defined by

What it means for a function on a Banach space to be holomorphic is defined in the article on Infinite dimensional holomorphy.

Properties

 For any point x in B,

 d can also be given by the following formula, which Carathéodory attributed to Erhard Schmidt:

 For all a and b in B,

with equality if and only if either a = b or there exists a bounded linear functional ℓ ∈ X∗ such that ||ℓ|| = 1, ℓ(a + b) = 0 and

Moreover, any ℓ satisfying these three conditions has |ℓ(a − b)| = ||a − b||.

 Also, there is equality in (1) if ||a|| = ||b|| and ||a − b|| = ||a|| + ||b||. One way to do this is to take b = −a.
 If there exists a unit vector u in X that is not an extreme point of the closed unit ball in X, then there exist points a and b in B such that there is equality in (1) but b ≠ ±a.

Carathéodory length of a tangent vector

There is an associated notion of Carathéodory length for tangent vectors to the ball B. Let x be a point of B and let v be a tangent vector to B at x; since B is the open unit ball in the vector space X, the tangent space TxB can be identified with X in a natural way, and v can be thought of as an element of X. Then the Carathéodory length of v at x, denoted α(x, v), is defined by

One can show that α(x, v) ≥ ||v||, with equality when x = 0.

See also
Earle–Hamilton fixed point theorem

References

 

Hyperbolic geometry
Metric geometry